Louis Pesch (11 March 1904 – 22 February 1959) was a Luxembourgian cyclist. He competed in two events at the 1924 Summer Olympics.

References

External links
 

1904 births
1959 deaths
Luxembourgian male cyclists
Olympic cyclists of Luxembourg
Cyclists at the 1924 Summer Olympics
Place of birth missing